Cumberland is a former municipality and now geographic township in eastern Ontario, Canada. It was an incorporated township from 1800 to 1999, when it was incorporated as the City of Cumberland, then ceased to be a separate municipality in 2001, when it was amalgamated into the city of Ottawa. It now exists only as a geographic township.

History

Cumberland was originally incorporated as a township in 1800 as part of Russell County. It took its name from the Duke of Cumberland (later King of Hanover). When an upper-tier Regional level of government was created in 1969 to replace neighbouring Carleton County, the township was removed from Russell County and incorporated into the new Regional Municipality of Ottawa–Carleton.

The township comprised the eastern portion of Ottawa's Orléans suburb as well as the communities of Cumberland Village, Carlsbad Springs, Navan, Notre-Dame-des-Champs, Sarsfield, and Vars.

Almost 200 years after it was first incorporated, Cumberland became a city in 1999.  City status was short-lived, however, as the municipality and all the other constituent municipalities (including the city of Ottawa) of the Regional Municipality of Ottawa–Carleton were amalgamated in 2001, to form a single municipality – the new City of Ottawa.

Cumberland now forms part of Ottawa. The largest portion of the former municipality now forms Orléans South-Navan Ward, previously named Cumberland Ward, and is represented at Ottawa City Council.  Most of the suburban neighbourhood of Orléans, which straddled the former boundary between Cumberland and the city of Gloucester, has been split off from Cumberland and Gloucester and is now joined in Orléans East-Cumberland and Orléans West-Innes Wards. Thus, Orléans South-Navan Ward is now primarily rural in nature, made up of historic villages that now comprise bedroom communities of Ottawa.

Attractions

Cumberland Heritage Village Museum
The Cumberland Heritage Village Museum, which depicts rural life in a village setting during the 1920s and 1930s, celebrated its 35th anniversary on September 25, 2011. The museum features a General Store, one-room schoolhouse and antique vehicles at the village garage, a tractor-pulled wagon ride, and farm animals. The former Knox Presbyterian/United Church building (1904-1980) and its artefacts were relocated from Vars to the Cumberland Heritage Village Museum. A memorial Roll of Honor and plaque from the Knox Presbyterian Church are dedicated to its members who served and to those who gave their lives in the First World War. A memorial scroll from the Knox Presbyterian Church is dedicated to its members who served in the Second World War.

Every other Sunday, the Ottawa Valley Live Steamers and Model Engineers are on site to give rides on their model trains. The museum has a collection of over 20,000 artifacts, including ceramic, textile and agricultural equipment, many of which have never been on display. The museum and artifact collection were included amongst other architecturally interesting and historically significant buildings in Doors Open Ottawa in 2012.

Other attractions 
A memorial stands in front of St. Andrews United Church, dedicated to soldiers who lost their lives during the First and Second World Wars, as well as the Korean War.

In 2017, Dr. Ranjit Pereira opened Humanics Sanctuary and Sculpture Park, a non-commercial art object dedicated to representation of world religions, cults and ethical teaching.

Population breakdown
2001 population: 52,430
2006 population: 62,694
2011 population: 74,581
Population of rural Cumberland: 11,693
Cumberland Village/Bella Vista/Cumberland Estates/Becketts Creek: 3,901
Navan/Carlsbad Springs (part)/Notre-Dame-Des-Champs (part): 3,649
Vars: 1,424
Sarsfield/Leonard/Southeast Cumberland: 2,718
Population of Orleans (in Cumberland): 62,888
Avalon / Notting Gate: 16,687
Queenswood Village / Chatelaine Village: 4,114
Springridge / Cardinal Creek: 5,004
Fallingbrook: 25,399
Queenswood Heights: 11,684
2016 population: 81,057
Population of rural Cumberland: 11,879
Cumberland Village/Bella Vista/Cumberland Estates/Becketts Creek: 4,101  
Navan/Carlsbad Springs (part)/Notre-Dame-Des-Champs (part): 4,106 
Vars: 1,514 
Sarsfield/Leonard/Southeast Cumberland: 2,158 
Population of Orleans (in Cumberland): 69,178
Avalon / Notting Gate: 23,459 
Queenswood Village / Chatelaine Village: 4,206 
Springridge / Cardinal Creek: 5,604 
Fallingbrook: 24,878 
Queenswood Heights: 11,031

See also

List of townships in Ontario

References 

 City of Ottawa Act, 1999 S.O. 1999, CHAPTER 14, Schedule E
Bibliography

Former cities in Ontario
Former municipalities now in Ottawa
Neighbourhoods in Ottawa
Geographic townships in Ontario
1880 establishments in Ontario
2000 disestablishments in Ontario
Populated places disestablished in 2000